The Institute of Cultural Heritage, Tourism and Hospitality Management (ICHTHM) was established at University of Swat in Pakistan with a view to prepare professionals in cultural heritage management, tourism and hospitality management, and archaeology.

Overview 
ICHTHM has been established with a view to save the tangible and intangible cultural heritage of Swat region, to establish an archaeological and ethnic profile of the region, to explore the genesis of the cultural activities, to trace the complex and rich historical past of the ancient period of the country, to promote Eco- and cultural tourism of Pakistan in general and the Malakand division and the Northern Areas in particular, and to impart quality education at graduate, undergraduate and postgraduate levels on a par with international standards.

The administrative leader of the school is Dr. Hassan Sher, currently vice chancellor.

Foundation 
The Institute was founded and established by Prof. Dr. Muhammad Jahanzeb Khan, Vice-Chancellor of the University of Swat, in 2012 with co-founder Mr. Aatif Iqbal. The current In-charge of ICHTHM is Dr. Zarawar Khan. Muhammad Wali Ullah is also a new faculty member of this institute now.

Students 
The Institute of Culture Heritage, Tourism and Hospitality Management (ICHTHM) is committed to regulate the training and education of its students in order to ensure that a newly qualified 
Culture Heritage Management, Tourism and Hospitality Management Professionals. The Institute is now offering BS degree program in Archaeology and Tourism. It considers inside to produce students

References 

 Information from Academia.edu
 

2012 establishments in Pakistan
Educational institutions established in 2012
Academic institutions in Pakistan
Tourism in Pakistan
Swat District
Organisations based in Khyber Pakhtunkhwa
Buildings and structures in Khyber Pakhtunkhwa